Iltuganovo (İltuğan) is a rural locality (a selo) in Staromusinsky Selsoviet, Karmaskalinsky District, Bashkortostan, Russia. The population was 428 as of 2010. There are 7 streets.

Geography 
Iltuganovo is located 12 km southwest of Karmaskaly (the district's administrative centre) by road. Shaymuratovo is the nearest rural locality.

References 

Rural localities in Karmaskalinsky District